Riverside High School for Engineering and Design is Yonkers' 6th public high school. It opened to 9th grade students in September 2007. Riverside High School is also known as RED (Riverside Engineering and Design) and aims to be environmentally friendly. Its first graduating class is the class of 2011. This building was constructed in 1990 and opened in 1992 as Museum Middle School.

References 

Public high schools in Yonkers, New York